Colégio Dom Amando is a Catholic secondary school founded in Santarém, Brazil in 1966 by the Congregation of Holy Cross.

Colégio Dom Amando is a Roman Catholic School ranging from grammar school to high school.  The school was founded by Bishop Anselmo Petrula, A Franciscan from Germany in 1943.  In 1951, the administration was turned over to the Congregation of the Brothers of Holy Cross.  The present enrollment is 1210 students.  The school prepares their student for the university and to be good citizens.

Holy Cross secondary schools
Congregations of Holy Cross
Catholic secondary schools in Brazil
Educational institutions established in 1966
1966 establishments in Brazil